Dichocrocis pardalis is a species of moth of the family Crambidae. It is found in Papua New Guinea.

It has a wingspan of 30-40mm.

References

External links
images at boldsystems.org

Spilomelinae
Moths described in 1907